Friedrich Heinrich Ludwig Krevel, known as Louis Krevel (19 September 1801,  Braunschweig - 14 May 1876, Trier) was a German portrait painter of the Biedermeier period.

Biography 
His father, Johann Hilarius Krevel (1776-1846) was an art dealer and portrait painter of some note who experimented with new methods of producing lithographs. Through Krauskopf's contacts, in 1824, Krevel was able to go study in Paris. While there, he may have worked with Antoine-Jean Gros and was influenced by the works of Ingres. 

In 1827, one of his portraits was accepted for the Salon. The followed year, he opened his own studio and his name appeared in the Almanach des 25.000 adresses des principaux habitants de Paris. As a result, he received a commission from the town of  Sète to make a copy of a painting by François Gérard, depicting the coronation of Charles X. His portraits did not provide sufficient income, however, so he also worked as a decorative painter.

In 1830, he decided to return to Germany and appears to have worked in Nordrhein-Westfalen. By 1836, he was working in the Saar region and, four years later, was exhibiting at the Prussian Academy of Arts. His works were praised by Christian Daniel Rauch, who tried to persuade him to move to Berlin. Krevel apparently preferred the lack of competition where he was. Based on the locations of his showings, he spent most of his time in Baden-Baden but travelled frequently as his commissions dictated. Most of his clients were from the newly thriving bourgeoisie created by the industrialization of the Saar.

Sometime in the mid-1840s, he settled in Cologne and became a member of the Kölnischer Kunstverein. Through his friendship with Jakob Götzenberger, he also maintained contact with the kunstverein in Mannheim. In 1856, he participated in another exhibit at the Prussian Academy.

In 1865, discouraged by the growing popularity of portrait photography, he retired from painting, became withdrawn and moved to a small house in Freiburg im Breisgau. He suffered a stroke in 1873 and moved to Trier to live with his sister, Jenny, who was newly widowed. His health continued to deteriorate and he died there three years later.

References

Further reading
 Christof Trepesch (ed.): Kultur des Biedermeier – der Maler Louis Krevel. Wernersche Verlagsgesellschaft, Worms 2001, 
 Eva Elisabetha Schmidt: Louis Krevel (1801–1876) – Leben und Werk. Ein Beitrag zur Porträtmalerei der ersten Hälfte des 19. Jahrhunderts., University of Bonn 2009. (Dissertation)
 Robert Skwirblies: "Krevel, Ludwig (Krevel, Louis)", in: France Nerlich, Bénédicte Savoy and Arnaud Bertinet (eds.): Pariser Lehrjahre. Ein Lexikon zur Ausbildung deutscher Maler in der französischen Hauptstadt. Vol.1 1793–1843, Walter de Gruyter, 2013, pgs.158–160.

External links 

Louis Krevel paintings available for auction at Invaluable 

1801 births
1876 deaths
19th-century German painters
19th-century German male artists
German male painters
Biedermeier painters
German portrait painters
Artists from Braunschweig